The following highways are numbered 308:

Brazil
 BR-308

Canada
 Manitoba Provincial Road 308
 Nova Scotia Route 308
 Prince Edward Island Route 308
 Saskatchewan Highway 308

China
 China National Highway 308

Costa Rica
 National Route 308

Japan
 Japan National Route 308

United States
  Arkansas Highway 308
  Arkansas Highway 308 Business
  Arkansas Highway 308 Spur
 Florida:
  Florida State Road 308 (former)
  County Road 308 (Putnam County, Florida)
  County Road 308B (Putnam County, Florida)
  Georgia State Route 308
  Kentucky Route 308
  Louisiana Highway 308
  Louisiana Highway 308 Spur (former)
  Maryland Route 308 (unsigned)
  Minnesota State Highway 308
  Montana Secondary Highway 308
 New York:
  New York State Route 308
 County Route 308 (Albany County, New York)
  County Route 308 (Erie County, New York)
 County Route 308 (Wayne County, New York)
  North Carolina Highway 308
  Ohio State Route 308
  Pennsylvania Route 308
  South Carolina Highway 308
  Tennessee State Route 308
 Texas:
  Texas State Highway 308
  Texas State Highway Loop 308
  Farm to Market Road 308
  Utah State Route 308 (former)
  Virginia State Route 308
  Washington State Route 308

Other areas:
  Puerto Rico Highway 308
  U.S. Virgin Islands Highway 308